Artur Yuspashyan (born 7 September 1989) is an Armenian professional footballer who plays as a defensive midfielder for Gandzasar Kapan. He has also made several appearances for the Armenia national football team.

Personal life
Artur Yuspashyan became a father on 5 February 2013 with his wife. Their first-born child was named Adrian.

References

External links
 Profile at FFA website
 
 

1989 births
Living people
Sportspeople from Yerevan
Armenian footballers
Association football midfielders
Armenia international footballers
FC Pyunik players
Anagennisi Deryneia FC players
Cypriot First Division players
Armenian Premier League players
Armenian expatriate sportspeople in Cyprus
Expatriate footballers in Cyprus